Magia i Miecz (Polish for: Magic and Sword) was the first RPG-oriented magazine in Poland. Started in 1993, it ceased publishing in 2002 after 103 issues. The publisher was Wydawnictwo MAG. Tomasz Kołodziejczak served as the editor of the magazine.

On 18 March 2014 Kuźnia Gier publishing house announced about acquiring the rights to title and reactivating the magazine and hold a crowdfunding project for restarting the magazine. The magazine published only six issues before going defunct in 2018.

See also
 List of magazines in Poland

References

1993 establishments in Poland
2002 disestablishments in Poland
Defunct magazines published in Poland
Magazines disestablished in 2002
Magazines established in 1993
Polish-language magazines
Polish role-playing games
Role-playing game magazines